In Riemannian geometry and relativity theory, an orthonormal frame is a tool for studying the structure of a differentiable manifold equipped with a metric.  If M is a manifold equipped with a metric g, then an orthonormal frame at a point P of M is an ordered basis of the tangent space at P consisting of vectors which are orthonormal with respect to the bilinear form gP.

See also 
Frame (linear algebra)
Frame bundle
k-frame
Moving frame
Frame fields in general relativity

References

Riemannian geometry